Semalea is a genus of skipper butterflies in the family Hesperiidae.

Species
Semalea arela (Mabille, 1891)
Semalea atrio (Mabille, 1891)
Semalea kola Evans, 1937
Semalea pulvina (Plötz, 1879)
Semalea sextilis (Plötz, 1886)

Species with doubtful status
Semalea proxima (Plötz, 1886) (nomen dubium)
Semalea bauri (Plötz, 1886) (nomen dubium)

References

External links
Natural History Museum Lepidoptera genus database
Seitz, A. Die Gross-Schmetterlinge der Erde 13: Die Afrikanischen Tagfalter. Plate XIII 79

Erionotini
Hesperiidae genera